The 1824 United States presidential election in Louisiana took place between October 26 and December 2, 1824, as part of the 1824 United States presidential election. The state legislature chose five representatives, or electors to the Electoral College, who voted for president and vice president.

During this election, the Democratic-Republican Party was the only major national party, and four different candidates from this party sought the presidency. Louisiana cast three electoral votes for Andrew Jackson and two for John Quincy Adams.

Results

See also
 United States presidential elections in Louisiana

References

Louisiana
1824
1824 Louisiana elections